The Shuishe Pier is a pier at Sun Moon Lake in Yuchi Township, Nantou County, Taiwan.

Destinations
The pier serves for destinations to Ita Thao Pier and Xuanguang Pier at the other perimeter sides of Sun Moon Lake.

Transportation
The pier is accessible by bus from Taichung HSR station or Taichung TRA station.

See also
 Transportation in Taiwan

References

Piers in Nantou County